Hugh Pearman (born 1 June 1945 in Edgbaston, Birmingham, England) is a former English cricketer.

Pearman studied at Churchill College, Cambridge, and represented Cambridge University in 1969 and Middlesex from 1969 to 1972 in twelve first-class and three List A matches as right-handed batsman and a slow left-arm orthodox bowler.  He scored one first-class half-century, in his last game in 1972, and took 16 wickets. He scored a first-class century, 133, opening the batting for Cambridge against Marylebone Cricket Club (MCC) in July 1969, but the status of the match was changed to non-first-class a few weeks later.

His elder brother Roger also represented Middlesex.

References

External links 
 
 

1945 births
Cambridge University cricketers
English cricketers
Living people
Middlesex cricketers
People from Edgbaston
Oxford and Cambridge Universities cricketers
Alumni of Churchill College, Cambridge